Sparostes is a genus of beetles in the family Carabidae, containing the following species:

 Sparostes brevicollis Putzeys, 1866
 Sparostes striatulus Putzeys, 1866

References

Scaritinae